Eric Bloch (April 2, 1939 – September 20, 2014) was an advisor to the Reserve Bank of Zimbabwe and a newspaper columnist.

Bloch was born on April 2, 1939, in Johannesburg, South Africa, to Hans Bloch and his wife Friedel. The family migrated to Bulawayo, Zimbabwe when Eric was a child. The Bloch's originated in Hamburg and had a strong German heritage. After Hitler came to power in 1933, many Jews left Germany and settled in various parts of the world. Hans Bloch, Eric's father moved his family to South Africa. In 1951, Hans Bloc was invited to join a firm of accountants and consultants in Bulawayo. Eric's mother came from a Lithuanian family forced to move to South Africa after the 19th century pogroms.

Eric attended Milton Boys Junior and then went on to Milton Boys' High. A chartered accountant by profession, Bloch was a regular Zimbabwe Independent newspaper columnist who spent most of his life analyzing Zimbabwe's complex economic and political challenges.

He was chairman of the advisory board of the National University of Science and Technology (NUST) Faculty of Architecture and Quantity Surveying, and a member of the Industrial Advisory Board of the Faculty of Journalism and Media Studies.

He was a member of the Jewish Community in Bulawayo; Eric and his wife Baileh were Orthodox Jews.

References

1939 births
Economy of Zimbabwe
2014 deaths